Alikovka is a rural locality (a selo) in Kondrashovskoye Rural Settlement, Ilovlinsky District, Volgograd Oblast, Russia. The population was 75 as of 2010.

Geography 
Alikovka is located in steppe, on the left bank of the Berdiya River, 32 km northeast of Ilovlya (the district's administrative centre) by road. Chernozubovka is the nearest rural locality.

References 

Rural localities in Ilovlinsky District